Amiseginae is a subfamily of cuckoo wasps in the family Chrysididae. There are more than 30 genera and 150 described species in Amiseginae.

Genera
These 38 genera belong to the subfamily Amiseginae:

 Adelphe Mocsáry, 1890
 Afrosega Krombein, 1983
 Alieniscus Benoit, 1951
 Amisega Cameron, 1888
 Anachrysis Krombein, 1986
 Anadelphe Kimsey, 1987
 Atoposega Krombein, 1957
 Baeosega Krombein, 1983
 Bupon Kimsey, 1986
 Cladobethylus Kieffer, 1922
 Reidia Krombein, 1957
 Colocar Krombein, 1957
 Duckeia Costa Lima, 1936
 Exopapua Krombein, 1957
 Exova Riek, 1955
 Imasega Krombein, 1983
 Indothrix Krombein, 1957
 Isegama Krombein, 1980
 Kryptosega Kimsey, 1986
 Leptosega Krombein, 1984
 Magdalium Kimsey, 1986
 Mahinda Krombein, 1983
 Myrmecomimesis Dalla Torre, 1897
 Nesogyne Krombein, 1957
 Nipponosega Kurzenko & Lelej, 1994
 Noumeasega Kimsey, 2014
 Obenbergerella Strand, 1929
 Perissosega Krombein, 1983
 Rohweria Fouts, 1925
 Saltasega Krombein, 1983
 Senesega Kimsey, 2005
 Serendibula Krombein, 1980
 † Eosega Martynova, 2017
 † Foveorisus Martynova, 2017
 † Palaeobethyloides Brues, 1933
 † Palaeobethylus Brues, 1923
 † Protadelphe Krombein, 1986
 † Protamisega Evans, 1973

References

Further reading

 

Parasitic wasps
Chrysididae